Orhan Altan (4 January 1934 – February 2007) was a Turkish athlete. He competed in the men's pole vault at the 1960 Summer Olympics.

References

External links
 

1934 births
2007 deaths
Athletes (track and field) at the 1960 Summer Olympics
Turkish male pole vaulters
Olympic athletes of Turkey